Yalova Province is a province in northwestern Turkey, on the eastern coast of the Sea of Marmara. Its adjacent provinces are Bursa to the south and Kocaeli to the east. The population of the Yalova Province was 203,741 in 2010. Prior to 1930, the area around Yalova constituted a district of Kocaeli Province; from 1930 to 1995, it was made part of Istanbul Province; in 1995, the area was separated and made into the current Yalova Province.

The provincial capital is the city of Yalova.

Districts 

Yalova Province is divided into 6 districts:
 Altınova
 Armutlu
 Çiftlikköy
 Çınarcık
 Termal
 Yalova

Notable natives 
 Muharrem İnce - Politician
 Mehmet Okur - NBA basketball player
 Şebnem Ferah - Singer
 İzel (İzel Çeliköz) - Singer

Gallery

See also
 East Marmara Development Agency

References

External links

  Yalova governor's official website
  Yalova municipality's official website
  Yalova weather forecast information

 
States and territories established in 1995